"2021" is a song by American indie pop band Vampire Weekend. Alongside "Harmony Hall", it served as the double A-side lead single for their fourth studio album Father of the Bride, and was released on January 24, 2019, by Columbia Records. "2021" was later re-released on December 22, 2021 as a collaboration 12" single alongside "Talking" by Haruomi Hosono.

Composition
The "sparse lovelorn ballad" is built around a sample of the ambient track "Talking", composed in the 1980s by Haruomi Hosono for Japanese retail company Muji. It features a soft pulsing synth and fingerpicked guitars, along with a distorted vocal sample of the word "boy" sung by Jenny Lewis.

Personnel
Credits adapted from Qobuz.

Musicians
 Ezra Koenig – vocals, guitar
 Jenny Lewis – additional vocals
 Ariel Rechtshaid – programming, synthesizer, bass guitar

Engineers
 Ariel Rechtshaid – engineering, mixing
 Chris Kasych – engineering
 John DeBold – engineering
 Ezra Koenig – mixing
 Chris Allgood – assistant engineering
 Emily Lazar – mastering

Charts

References

2019 singles
2019 songs
Vampire Weekend songs
Songs written by Ezra Koenig
Song recordings produced by Ariel Rechtshaid
Columbia Records singles
Songs written by Ariel Rechtshaid